Saard Panyawan (born 11 January 1965) is a Thai windsurfer. He placed 23rd in the Windglider event the 1984 Summer Olympics and 26th in the Men's Lechner A-390 event at the 1992 Summer Olympics.

References

External links
 Saard Panyawan at World Sailing (1984 Olympics)
 Sa-ard Panyawan at World Sailing (1992 Olympics)
 

1965 births
Living people
Saard Panyawan
Saard Panyawan
Saard Panyawan
Sailors at the 1984 Summer Olympics – Windglider
Sailors at the 1992 Summer Olympics – Lechner A-390
Saard Panyawan
Asian Games medalists in sailing
Sailors at the 1986 Asian Games
Sailors at the 1990 Asian Games
Medalists at the 1986 Asian Games
Medalists at the 1990 Asian Games
Saard Panyawan
Place of birth missing (living people)